Larner is a surname. Notable people with the surname include:

Benjamin Coyle-Larner (born 1994), British rapper
Christina Larner (1933–1983), British historian
Edgar Larner (1869–1930), British electrical engineer and inventor
Elizabeth Larner (born 1931), British actress and a singer with a powerful soprano voice
George Larner (1875–1949), British athlete who competed mainly in the 10 mile walk
Gerald Larner (1936–2018), British music critic
Gorman DeFreest Larner, awarded the Distinguished Service Cross, First Lieutenant (Air Service), U.S. Army, for heroism in 1918
Jeremy Larner (born 1937), author, poet, journalist and speechwriter
Jesse Larner (born 1963), New York-based writer on politics and culture

See also
Larner-Johnson Valve, a mechanism used in dams and water pumping to control the flow of water through large water pipes